Dipodium purpureum is an orchid species that is native to Borneo. The species was formally described in 1910 by Dutch botanist Johannes Jacobus Smith.

References

External links

purpureum
Orchids of Borneo
Plants described in 1910